Arthur Ashe defeated the defending champion Jimmy Connors in the final, 6–1, 6–1, 5–7, 6–4 to win the gentlemen's singles tennis title at the 1975 Wimbledon Championships. He became the first Black man to win the singles title at Wimbledon.

Seeds

  Jimmy Connors (final)
  Ken Rosewall (fourth round)
  Björn Borg (quarterfinals)
  Guillermo Vilas (quarterfinals)
  Ilie Năstase (second round)
  Arthur Ashe (champion)
  Stan Smith (first round)
  Raúl Ramírez (quarterfinals)
  Tom Okker (quarterfinals)
  John Alexander (second round)
  Roscoe Tanner (semifinals)
  Jan Kodeš (second round)
  Marty Riessen (fourth round)
  Vitas Gerulaitis (first round)
  Onny Parun (third round)
  Tony Roche (semifinals)

Qualifying

Draw

Finals

Top half

Section 1

Section 2

Section 3

Section 4

Bottom half

Section 5

Section 6

Section 7

Section 8

References

External links

 1975 Wimbledon Championships – Men's draws and results at the International Tennis Federation

Men's Singles
Wimbledon Championship by year – Men's singles